Boiçucanga is a beach and neighborhood in the city of São Sebastião, located on São Paulo state's northern coastline. The name comes from the Tupiniquim Indian language. Boi means snake. Açu means big and Canga means head. The sea at the beach is calm and has thick, yellowish sand.

Beaches of Brazil
São Sebastião, São Paulo